State Route 167 (SR 167) is a state highway in the U.S. state of California in Mono County. From U.S. Route 395, SR 167 runs along Pole Line Road north of Mono Lake eastward to the Nevada state line where it meets Nevada State Route 359.  This road runs almost completely straight, and can be seen almost  into the distance as a straight line.

Route description
SR 167 begins with an at-grade intersection with U.S. Route 395. The road then heads northeastward in a straight line, moving slightly north of the north shore of Mono Lake. The route continues in a straight line through a barren landscape in Mono County where it intersects Dobie Meadows Road. SR 167 meets its eastern terminus at the Nevada state line. The road continues as Nevada State Route 359 through Mineral County.

SR 167 is part of the California Freeway and Expressway System, but is not part of the National Highway System, a network of highways that are considered essential to the country's economy, defense, and mobility by the Federal Highway Administration. SR 167 is eligible to be included in the State Scenic Highway System, but it is not officially designated as a scenic highway by the California Department of Transportation.

Major intersections

See also

References

External links

California Highways: Route 167
California @ AARoads.com - State Route 167
Caltrans: Route 167 highway conditions

167
State Route 167